The 2010 Autosport 1000 km of Silverstone was the fifth and final round of the 2010 Le Mans Series season and the inaugural race of the Intercontinental Le Mans Cup. It took place at Silverstone Circuit on 12 September. Manufacturers in the LMP1 and GT2 categories were eligible to compete for points in the ILMC, and designated teams in all categories except Formula Le Mans also competed for an ILMC title.

This was the first time the LMS cars use the new, longer "Arena" configuration introduced earlier this year; it was scheduled to run 170 laps opposed to the 195 in the previous races that was run in what is today known as the "Bridge" circuit.

Qualifying

Qualifying result
Pole position winners in each class are marked in bold.

Note that ILMC competitors are marked with an asterisk (*).

Race

Race result
Class winners in bold.  Cars failing to complete 70% of winner's distance marked as Not Classified (NC).

See also
1000 km Silverstone

References

|-
! colspan="3" style="background: #FFFFFF;" |Le Mans Series
|- style="text-align:center;"
|width="35%" align="center"|Previous race:1000 km of Hungaroring
|width="30%" style="text-align: center;"|2010 season
|width="35%" align="center"|Next race:none
|-
! colspan="3" style="background: #FFFFFF;" |Intercontinental Le Mans Cup
|- style="text-align:center;"
|width="35%" align="center"|Previous race:none
|width="30%" style="text-align: center;"|2010 season
|width="35%" align="center"|Next race:Petit Le Mans

Silverstone
6 Hours of Silverstone
Silverstone 1000
2010 Intercontinental Le Mans Cup season